

Race callers
Trevor Denman (2006-2011)
Tom Durkin (1987-2000)
Dave Johnson (1981-2005)

Hosts
Jay Crawford (2004)
Rece Davis (2003-2009)
Tom Durkin (1987-2000)
Chris Fowler (1998-2007)
Terry Gannon (2005-2007)
Jay Harris (2006)
Todd Harris (2006)
Dave Johnson (1981-2005)
Jim Kelly (2001)
Suzy Kolber (2001-2003)
Kenny Mayne (1999-2011)
Brent Musburger (2004-2008)
Kenny Rice (1997-2006)
Joe Tessitore (2006-2011)
Chris Lincoln (1985-2007)
Bob Neumeier (1993-1998)
Jeff Medders (2000-2006,2008)
Bill Seward (1984, 1996-2000)
Rob Stone (2007)
Sandra Neil Wallace (1991-2000)

Analysts
Thea Andrews (2004-2006)
Pete Axthelm (1985-1991)
Jerry D. Bailey (2006-2011)
Caton Bredar (1992-1998, 2007-2011)
Charlsie Cantey (1985-2002)
Catherine Crier (2004)
Tom Dawson (1987)
Tom Durkin (1987-2000)
Jeannine Edwards (1995-2011)
Dave Johnson (1981-2005)
Alan Kirschenbaum (1986)
Hank Goldberg (1997-2011)
Kurt Hoover (2004-2005)
Dan Issel (1991)
Nick Luck (2006-2011)
Chris McCarron (2002-2003)
Randy Moss (1999-2011)
Bob Neumeier (1993-1998)
Jessica Pacheco (2008)
Jay Privman (2002-2011)
Rick Reilly (2008-2011)
Mary Ellen Sarama (1986)
Tommy Smyth (2005)
Lesley Visser (1994-2000)
Jack Whitaker (1996-2001)

Reporters
Thea Andrews (2004-2006)
Caton Bredar (1992-1998, 2007-2011)
Jennifer Burke (2002-2003)
Charlsie Cantey (1985-2002)
Patricia Cooksey (2006)
Catherine Crier (2004)
Rece Davis (2007-2009)
Jeannine Edwards (1995-2011)
Pat Forde (2008)
Kurt Hoover (2004-2005)
Sharlene Wells Hawkes (1987-2003)
Quint Kessenich (2003-2007)
Jeff Medders (2000)
Eleanor Mondale (2002-2003)
Nick Luck (2006-2011)
Laffit Pincay III (2007)
Jay Privman (2002-2011)
Kenny Rice (1982-2003)
Tom Rinaldi (2006-2011)
Jeremy Schaap (2006, 2010-2011)
Gary Seibel (2001)
Sharon Smith (1980-1990)
Rob Stone (2007)
Joe Tessitore (2006-2007)
Lesley Visser (1994-2000)
Sandra Neil Wallace (1991-1998)
Jack Whitaker (1996-2001)

ESPN
Thoroughbred racing commentators
ESPN